Police Story is a Hong Kong action comedy crime film franchise created by and starring Jackie Chan. It comprises seven films, variously directed by Jackie Chan, Stanley Tong, Benny Chan, and Ding Sheng, and produced by Raymond Chow, Leonard Ho, Jackie Chan, Barbie Tung, Willie Chan, Solon So and Yang Du. The first film Police Story was released on 14 December 1985. The film's success led to three sequels, two spin-offs (Crime Story and Supercop 2), and two reboots (New Police Story and Police Story 2013).

Chan began work on the film after a disappointing experience working with director James Glickenhaus on The Protector, which was intended to be his entry into the American film market. The first Police Story film is considered by fans to be one of Chan's best films. It was a massive hit in Asia. According to his autobiography, I Am Jackie Chan, Chan considers the film his best, in terms of action and stunts. The first three Police Story films were voted among the best action films of all time in Time Outs poll of film critics, directors, actors, and stunt actors, with Police Story ranked 4th, Police Story 2 ranked 61st, and Police Story 3: Supercop ranked 75th.

Films
All of the Police Story films were produced by Raymond Chow, Leonard Ho, Jackie Chan, Barbie Tung, Willie Chan, Solon So and Yang Du, distributed by Golden Harvest, Media Asia, Golden Way Films Co. Ltd., Fortune Star Media Ltd., and JCE Movies. They were all directed by Jackie Chan, Stanley Tong, Benny Chan and Ding Sheng.

Police Story (1985)

Police Story was made in 1985. The Royal Hong Kong Police Force is planning a major undercover sting called "Operation Boar Hunt" to arrest crime lord Chu Tao (Chor Yuen). Inspector Chan Ka-Kui (or Kevin Chan in some versions) is part of the operation, along with undercover officers stationed in a shanty town. After arresting Chu, Chan's next assignment is to protect Chu Tao's secretary, Selina Fong (Brigitte Lin), who plans to testify in court about Chu Tao's illegal activities. The trial fails due to Selina's tampering with evidence. Though Chu Tao is released on bail, he wants revenge against Ka-Kui, framing him for the murder of fellow policeman Inspector Man. Meanwhile, Selina, realizing Chu's criminality, goes to his office at a shopping mall to download incriminating data from Chu Tao's computer system. Chu Tao and Chan notice this and head to the mall. In the ensuing fight, Ka-Kui defeats all of Chu Tao's henchmen while the police apprehend Chu and the briefcase.

Police Story 2 (1988)

Police Story 2, made in 1988, featured many of the same actors reprising their roles from the original. The story picks up with Chan Ka-Kui being demoted to a traffic cop for causing so much damage in his apprehension of Chu. Chu has been released from prison on the pretense that he is terminally ill, and Chu and his clan continue to harass Chan and his girlfriend May as Chan gets reinstated to the detective unit when criminal bombers begin extorting money from businessmen. The film marks the last appearance of Lam Kwok-Hung as Superintendent Raymond Li.

Police Story 3: Supercop (1992)

Police Story 3: Supercop, also known as Supercop, was made in 1992. Michelle Yeoh joins the cast, portraying a police officer from mainland China. The story involves Chan and Yeoh's character going undercover to try to break up a drug smuggling ring. The action moves from China to Kuala Lumpur, where Chan's girlfriend May is kidnapped. The film marks the last appearance of Maggie Cheung as May. Michelle Yeoh reprises her role in the spin-off, called Supercop 2. Dimension Films released Supercop in the US in 1996 with some edits to the film, the complete replacement of all music and sound effects, and English dubbing.

Crime Story (1993)

This 1993 Hong Kong action crime thriller is directed by Kirk Wong, and starring Jackie Chan, Kent Cheng, Law Kar-ying and Puishan Au-yeung. The film was released in Hong Kong on 24 June 1993.

Unlike most Jackie Chan films, which feature a combination of action and comedy, Crime Story is mostly a serious film. The film is based on actual events surrounding of the 1990 kidnapping of a Chinese businessman Teddy Wang.

Supercop 2 (1993)

Supercop 2 (also known as Project S or Once a Cop), made in 1993, is a Hong Kong action film directed by Stanley Tong and starring Michelle Yeoh. It is a spin-off of Jackie Chan's Police Story film series involving the character Yeoh portrayed in Supercop, Inspector Jessica Yang. The film is also known as Project S in original territories and many other titles, including Police Story IV (inaccurately), Police Story 3 Part 2, and Supercop 2 (US).

Both Jackie Chan and Bill Tung have cameo appearances as Inspector Chan Ka-Kui and "Uncle" Bill Wong in the film. Although Jackie Chan only has a cameo appearance, some DVD covers prominently featured Chan, misleading audience to think that he was one of the main characters. He reprises his role as Inspector Chan, but in drag to catch a criminal in drag wearing the same wig and clothes.

First Strike (1996)

Police Story 4: First Strike, also known as First Strike, Police Story 4, or Jackie Chan's First Strike, was made in 1996 and is the only film in the Police Story series made partially in English. Jackie reprises his role as Chan Ka-Kui (also known in some versions as Jackie) for the final time as the Hong Kong cop works with Interpol to track down and arrest an illegal weapons dealer. Later Ka-Kui realizes that things are not as simple as they appear and soon finds himself a pawn of an organization posing as Russian intelligence. The action shifts away from Hong Kong and Asia, with a globe trekking espionage plot, lending the film the air of a James Bond adventure. The New Line Cinema release in the US contained various alterations. Filmed on location in Ukraine and Australia, the film also marks the last appearance of Bill Tung, who plays Chan's superior "Uncle" Bill Wong in the series.

New Police Story (2004)

New Police Story, made in 2004, is a reboot of the Police Story series. Chan portrays a disgraced detective named Chan Kwok-Wing, who accidentally leads his team into a trap from which he is the only survivor. Drowning his guilt in booze, he is eventually assigned a new younger partner who turns out to have his own secrets. However, they must work together if they are to stop the gang who killed Chan's team a year earlier. The film features younger Hong Kong actors such as Nicholas Tse, Charlene Choi, Charlie Yeung and Daniel Wu. The story features a more dramatic focus, taking a darker and more serious tone.

Police Story 2013 (2013)

Police Story 2013, made in 2013, stars Jackie Chan in another reboot of the series. The film is directed by Ding Sheng, who previously helmed Chan's Little Big Soldier. Unlike the previous Police Story films where he portrayed a Hong Kong cop, Jackie portrays a mainland Chinese officer named Zhong Wen. Zhong heads to Wu Bar in search of his estranged daughter, Miao Miao (Jing Tian). He disapproves of Miao's relationship with Wu Jiang (Liu Ye), the nightclub owner. However, Wu, who is looking for the release of a long-time prisoner, takes Zhong, Miao, and a group of strangers hostage. The film was distributed as Police Story: Lockdown in the United States by Well Go USA Entertainment and released in June 2015.

Reception

Box office performance

Critical response

Individual films

Police Story 

Jackie Chan's first film featuring Chan as a Hong Kong cop was a blockbuster in Asia, Hong Kong, US and other foreign countries. Chan returned to fame after his first attempt to cross over to Hollywood ended with The Protector becoming a box office bomb. The film grossed HK$26,626,760 in Hong Kong.

Police Story 2

Chan's second film in the series was an even bigger hit, grossing HK$34,151,609 in Hong Kong. Although the film was a huge success at the box office, it wasn't as appreciated as its predecessor at the Hong Kong Film Awards and only received one win.

Police Story 3: Supercop

Supercop is the first in the Police Story series not to be directed by Jackie, with Stanley Tong taking over the helm. It is also the last appearance in the series for Maggie Cheung as Ka-Kui's girlfriend, May. Supercop grossed HK$32,609,783 in its Hong Kong theatrical run.  After Chan's North American breakthrough in Rumble in the Bronx, Supercop was released in North America on 25 July 1996. Opening at 1,406 theatres, it grossed US$5,503,176 ($3,914 per screen), on its way to a total gross of US$16,270,600. The North American release by Dimension was well received.

James Berardinelli of website ReelViews wrote: "As is usual in a Chan film, the end credits (which show out-takes of failed stunts) are one of Supercops highlights. There are more laughs in this hilarious three-minute sequence than in the whole of Kingpin. I can't think of a better reason to stay through the entire movie. Ultimately, the closing montage points out one of the chief differences between Chan's stylized, fast-paced films and those of his American counterparts: this is action with a smile, not a grimace".

In the Washington Post, Richard Harrington said: "Chan seems to have met his soul mate in Khan [Michelle Yeoh], Asia's top female action star. Like Chan, Khan does her own fighting and stunts. Unlike the Hollywood action contingent, Chan and Khan don't rely on cinematic trickery. Theirs are not special effects, just spectacular ones. Connoisseurs will find Chan's helicopter-train chase far riskier, more exciting and more believable than its mates in Mission: Impossible and The Living Daylights".

Supercop 2

Supercop 2 was released in Hong Kong on 21 October 1993. In Hong Kong, the film managed to gross HK$9,337,853 (as of 8 November 1993). The film was released to the US nearly three years later and it managed to gross US$16,270,600.

Almar Haflidason of BBC Films said: "While not original, it's a good set-up for an action film. Conflicts of loyalty, moments of terrible realisation, and the facing up to of terrible choices are on offer here, but a muddy script structure and some very weak attempts at comedy hamper the flow of the film as Yeoh is partnered with muppet-like partners".

First Strike

First Strike was an enormous box office success in Hong Kong, grossing HK$57,518,794 during its theatrical run. It remains Jackie Chan's highest-grossing film in Hong Kong.

The film was released on 10 January 1997 in 1,344 North American theatres, grossing US$5,778,933 ($4,299 per screen) in its opening weekend. Its total North American box office gross was US$15,318,863.

The version of the film released in North American cinemas by New Line was met with mixed critical response. On Rotten Tomatoes it has an approval rating of 52% based on reviews from 23 critics.

Mike LaSalle of the San Francisco Chronicle was among the most enthusiastic of the reviewers: "One of the pleasures of being alive at this period of history is Jackie Chan. There are other pleasures, of course, and other movie pleasures, too. But few things in film today are as reliable as a Jackie Chan movie. Even if the picture is weak, Chan is never disappointing. Watching him in Jackie Chan's First Strike, a brand-new effort opening today, there's no doubt that this is a lovable original and a great popular artist. So this time Chan swims with sharks. He climbs from balcony to balcony on the top floor of a tall hotel building. He even—get this—drops 100 feet from a helicopter into a frozen lake, just as the helicopter explodes".

New Police Story

New Police Story opened in Hong Kong on 23 September 2004, where it made HK$5,625,746 in its first three days. It ended its run with HK$21 million, making it the fourth highest-grossing domestic release of the year.

The film received a limited release in the United Kingdom on 13 October 2006. In its opening weekend the film grossed GBP $19,332 having been shown in 16 theatres. It ranked No. 21 at the box office and averaged $1,208 per theatre. As of 22 October 2006, New Police Story had grossed a total of GBP $33,404 in its two-week release in the UK.

Police Story 2013

Police Story 2013 opened in China on 23 December 2013 and in Hong Kong on 16 January 2014 and was shown on 211,468 screens. It was a box office success, dominating the Chinese box office in the last week of the year, despite mixed reviews.

The film made US$21 million on its first weekend, and US$45 million in its first six days. Police Story 2013 grossed US$94,249,025 worldwide. A public screening of Police Story 2013 was held at the 2013 Beijing International Film Festival in April.

Awards and nominations
Police Story

 1986 Hong Kong Film Awards Won: Best Film Won: Best Action Choreography Nominated: Best Director (Jackie Chan)
 Nominated: Best Actor (Jackie Chan)
 Nominated: Best Actress (Brigitte Lin)
 Nominated: Best Cinematography (Cheung Yin-Cho)
 Nominated: Best Film Editing (Peter Cheung)

Police Story 2

 1989 Hong Kong Film Awards Won: Best Action ChoreographyPolice Story 3: Supercop

 1993 Hong Kong Film Awards Nominated: Best Actor (Jackie Chan)
 Nominated: Best Action Choreography (Stanley Tong, Tang Tak-Wing, Ailen Sit, Chan Man-Ching, Wong Ming-Sing)
 1992 Golden Horse Film Festival Won: Best Actor (Jackie Chan) Won: Best Editing (Peter Cheung, Cheung Kar-Fei)Crime Story1993 Golden Horse AwardsWon: Best Actor (Jackie Chan)1994 Hong Kong Film AwardsWon: Best Film Editing (Peter Cheung)Nomination: Best Action Choreography (Jackie Chan)
Nomination: Best Actor (Jackie Chan)
Nomination: Best Director (Kirk Wong)
Nomination: Best Picture
Nomination: Best Supporting Actor (Kent Cheng)

First Strike

 1997 Hong Kong Film Awards Won: Best Action Choreography (Stanley Tong) Nominated: Best Picture
 Nominated: Best Actor (Jackie Chan)
 Nominated: Best New Performer (Annie Wu)
 Nominated: Best Film Editing (Peter Cheung, Yau Chi-Wai)
 1996 Golden Horse Film Festival
 Won: Best Action Direction (Stanley Tong) 1997 MTV Movie Awards
 Nominated: Best Fight

New Police Story

 24th Annual Hong Kong Film Awards Nomination – Best Picture
 Nomination – Best Director (Benny Chan)
 Nomination – Best Actor (Jackie Chan)
 Nomination – Best Supporting Actor (Daniel Wu)
 Nomination – Best Editing (Yau Chi-Wai)
 Nomination – Best Action Design (Lee Chung-Chi, Jackie Chan Stunt Team)
 Nomination – Best Sound Effects (Kinson Tsang Kin-Cheung)
 Nomination – Best Visual Effects (Wong Won-Tak, Ho Chi-Fai)
 41st Annual Golden Horse Awards Won – Best Supporting Actor (Daniel Wu) Won – Best Action Choreography (Lee Chung-Chi, Jackie Chan Stunt Team) Won – Best Visual Effects (Victor Wong, Brian Ho) Won – Audience Choice Award Nomination – Best Editing (Yau Chi-Wai)
 Nomination – Best Art Direction (Wong Ching-Ching, Choo Sung-Pong, Oliver Wong)
 Nomination – Best Sound Effects (Tsang King-Cheung)

Police Story 201318th Beijing Screenings and China Film Outstanding International Contribution Awards Won – Outstanding International Contribution for a Chinese Film Cast and characters 
The following table shows the cast members who played the characters in the series.

 This table shows the characters and the actors who have portrayed them throughout the series
 Some actors are featured in several films but play different characters
 A dark grey cell indicates the character was not in the film
 While New Police Story and Police Story 2013 are part of the Police Story film series, they are not continuations of the original series and are considered reboots
 New Police Story and Police Story 2013 are separate reboots
 Supercop 2 is a spin-off of the Police Story series

Theme songs
Chan has performed the theme songs for the following Police Story films.

See also
Related film

Bleeding Steel, though not officially part of the franchise, was released under the title ポリス・ストーリー REBORN, Porisu Sutōrī Ribon''' (lit. Police Story Reborn) in Japan and even used an updated version of the Police Story'' title song once again sung by Jackie Chan in the end credits.

References

External links
 
 
 
 
 
 
 

Hong Kong film series
Film series introduced in 1985
Action film series
Comedy film series
Hong Kong action films
Hong Kong martial arts films
Police Story (film series)